Helen Kiner McCarthy (1884–1927), was an American painter. She was an original member of the Philadelphia Ten.

Biography
McCarthy was born in 1884 in Poland, Ohio. In 1904 she began her studies at the Philadelphia School of Design, studying under Elliott Daingerfield, and Henry B. Snell. She graduated in 1909. 

After graduation she shared a Philadelphia studio with Mary-Russell Ferrell Colton for several years and then with Edith Lucile Howard.

From 1910 through 1926 McCarthy exhibited her work at the Pennsylvania Academy of Fine Art, the Art Institute of Chicago, the Plastic Club,  and the National Association of Women Artists. In 1917 she participated in the first exhibition of the Philadelphia Ten at the Art Club of Philadelphia. 

McCarthy was a member of several art groups that focused on promoting women's art; the Plastic Club, and the National Association of Women Artists and its predecessor the National Association of Women Painters and Sculptors. She was also a member of the International Society of Arts and Letters and the New York Society of Painters.

McCarthy died in 1927.

Legacy
In 1930 National Academy of Design began awarding "Helen K. McCArthy Memorial Prize" for best landscape by a woman artist, forty years old or younger. The first award went to Janet Reid Kellogg.

References

1884 births 
1927 deaths
20th-century American women artists
Philadelphia School of Design for Women alumni